John Chappell Crissey III, also known as JC Crissey, is a British-American movie producer best known for helping bring to screen Blinded and That Samba Thing.

Background
JC Crissey was born 30 January 1965 in Orlando, Florida to American and Spanish parents and raised in Winter Park, Florida, United States. He graduated from Forest Lake Academy high school, obtained a BBA from Newbold College, Andrews University in 1987, an MBA from Rollins College in 1990, a DipM from CIM in 1992, a FCIM Fellowship from The Chartered Institute of Marketing in 1998 and a PhD in Media Arts Economics from Royal Holloway, University of London. Before working in the motion-picture industry he worked for IBM as their EMEA Vice President for Global Business Intelligence Solutions and for PWC Consulting as their Senior Marketing Strategy Consultant in Europe. Since 1999 he has been the CEO of London Pictures Limited and was admitted into the British Academy of Film and Television Arts as a Life Member in 2003 for his services to UK independent movie production.

Media academic
JC Crissey was also an Adjunct Lecturer at the Screen Academy Scotland from 2008 to 2014 and at the Media Arts Department, Royal Holloway University of London from 2010 to 2014. His unpublished PhD thesis is titled The UK low-budget film sector during the ‘digital revolution’ between 2000 and 2012: a quantitative assessment of its technological, economic and cultural characteristics.

Partial filmography
Blinded (2004), associate producer
Burning Light (2006), executive/co-producer
That Samba Thing (2007), producer
K (2008), producer
Doorways (2014), producer

References

External links
 

Living people
1965 births
People from Orlando, Florida